Paracephala is a genus of beetles in the family Buprestidae, the jewel beetles. They are native to Australia. They are black to purplish in color and are associated with grasses.

Species include:

 Paracephala aenea Blackburn, 1891
 Paracephala borea Bellamy, 1988
 Paracephala deserta Bellamy, 1988
 Paracephala hesperia Bellamy, 1988
 Paracephala murina Thomson, 1878
 Paracephala occidentalis (Macleay, 1888)
 Paracephala pistacina (Hope, 1846)

References

Buprestidae genera
Beetles of Australia